Galerías Monterrey was the first shopping mall in Monterrey, Mexico. Founded in 1983 with Liverpool, it has grown to attract upscale fashion stores, restaurants, and movie theaters.

External links
Official Website

Shopping malls in Monterrey
Shopping malls established in 1983